The 2020 Mexican Open (alson known as the Abierto Mexicano Telcel presentado por HSBC for sponsorship reasons) was a professional tennis tournament played on outdoor hard courts. It was the 27th edition of the men's Mexican Open (20th for the women), and part of the 2020 ATP Tour and the 2020 WTA Tour. It took place in Acapulco, Mexico between 24 and 29 February 2020, at the Princess Mundo Imperial.

Point distribution

ATP singles main-draw entrants

Seeds

1 Rankings as of February 17, 2020.

Other entrants 
The following players received wildcards into the main draw:
  Gerardo López Villaseñor 
  Cameron Norrie
  Mischa Zverev

The following player received entry into the singles main draw using a protected ranking:
  Mackenzie McDonald

The following player received entry as a special exempt:
  Pedro Martínez

The following players received entry from the qualifying draw:
  Damir Džumhur
  Marcos Giron
  Jason Jung 
  Tommy Paul

The following players received entry as lucky losers:
  Alex Bolt
  Taro Daniel

Withdrawals 
Before the tournament
  Kevin Anderson → replaced by  Kwon Soon-woo
  Matteo Berrettini → replaced by  Kyle Edmund
  Reilly Opelka → replaced by  Taro Daniel
  Lucas Pouille → replaced by  Steve Johnson
  Jordan Thompson → replaced by  Alex Bolt

Retirements 
  Nick Kyrgios

ATP doubles main-draw entrants

Seeds 

1 Rankings as of February 17, 2020.

Other entrants 
The following pairs received wildcards into the doubles main draw:
  Feliciano López /  Marc López
  Alexander Zverev /  Mischa Zverev

The following pair received entry from the qualifying draw:
  Nicholas Monroe /  Jackson Withrow

The following pair received entry as lucky losers:
  Luis David Martínez /  Miguel Ángel Reyes-Varela

Withdrawals 
Before the tournament
  Jordan Thompson

During the tournament
  Taylor Fritz

WTA singles main-draw entrants

Seeds

1 Rankings as of February 17, 2020.

Other entrants
The following players received wildcards into the main draw:
  Katie Volynets 
  Venus Williams 
  Renata Zarazúa

The following players received entry into the singles main draw using a protected ranking:
  Kateryna Bondarenko
  Katie Boulter
  Shelby Rogers
  Anna Karolína Schmiedlová
  CoCo Vandeweghe

The following players received entry from the qualifying draw:
  Usue Maitane Arconada 
  Caroline Dolehide 
  Sara Errani 
  Leylah Annie Fernandez 
  Kaja Juvan 
  Wang Xiyu

The following player received entry as a lucky loser:
  Francesca Di Lorenzo

Withdrawals 
Before the tournament
  Fiona Ferro → replaced by  Heather Watson
  Madison Keys → replaced by  Francesca Di Lorenzo
  Kateryna Kozlova → replaced by  Nao Hibino
  Rebecca Peterson → replaced by  CoCo Vandeweghe

WTA doubles main-draw entrants

Seeds

1 Rankings as of February 17, 2020.

Other entrants 
The following pairs received wildcards into the doubles main draw:
  Sara Errani /  Daniela Seguel 
  Marcela Zacarías /  Renata Zarazúa

The following pair received entry as alternates:
  Arantxa Rus /  Tamara Zidanšek

Withdrawals 
Before the tournament
  Renata Zarazúa (fatigue)
Before the tournament
  Sara Errani (left lower leg injury)

Champions

Men's singles

  Rafael Nadal def.  Taylor Fritz, 6–3, 6–2

Women's singles

  Heather Watson def.  Leylah Annie Fernandez, 6–4, 6–7(8–10), 6–1

Men's doubles

 Łukasz Kubot /  Marcelo Melo def.  Juan Sebastián Cabal /  Robert Farah, 7–6(8–6), 6–7(4–7), [11–9]

Women's doubles

  Desirae Krawczyk /  Giuliana Olmos def.  Kateryna Bondarenko /  Sharon Fichman, 6–3, 7–6(7–5)

References

External links
 

 
Abierto Mexicano Telcel
Abierto Mexicano Telcel
Abierto Mexicano Telcel
Mexican Open (tennis)
Abierto Mexicano Telcel